The Campania regional election of 1990 took place on 6 and 7 May 1990.

Events
Christian Democracy was by far the largest party, gaining more than double of the share of vote of its main competitors, the Italian Communist Party, which had its worst result ever in a regional election, and the Italian Socialist Party, that obtained its best result ever.

After the election Ferdinando Clemente, the incumbent Christian Democratic President, formed a new centre-left government (Pentapartito). In 1993 Clemente was replaced by fellow Christian Democrat Giovanni Grasso.

Results

Source: Ministry of the Interior

Elections in Campania
1990 elections in Italy